Sing Me a Love Song is a 1936 American musical film directed by Ray Enright and written by Sig Herzig and Jerry Wald. The film stars James Melton, Patricia Ellis, Hugh Herbert, ZaSu Pitts, Allen Jenkins and Nat Pendleton. The Warner Bros. film premiered in New York City on Christmas Day 1936 and went into general release on January 9, 1937.

Plot

Cast        
 James Melton as Jerry Haines
 Patricia Ellis as Jean Martin
 Hugh Herbert as Siegfried Hammerschlag
 ZaSu Pitts as Gwen Logan
 Allen Jenkins as 'Chris' Cross
 Nat Pendleton as Rocky

Reception 
The New York Times reviewer found Sing Me a Love Song "really pretty gay fare", with "several catchy Dubin and Warren tunes."

References

External links 
 
 
 
 

1936 musical films
1936 films
American black-and-white films
American musical films
1930s English-language films
Films directed by Ray Enright
Warner Bros. films
1930s American films